Monte Isola (also known by the name of the main island Montisola;) is a town and comune in the province of Brescia, in Lombardy.

It is located on the islands Montisola (the major island, from which it takes the name), Loreto and San Paolo in Lake Iseo and, its population is 1,770. Monte Isola's population is approximately spread over eleven villages and hamlets. There are several churches built between the 15th and the 17th century with frescoes, statues, altars in vernacular art.

Geography

Monte Isola includes 12 frazioni: Carzano, Cure, Masse, Menzino, Novale, Olzano, Peschiera Maraglio, Porto di Siviano, Sensole, Senzano, Sinchignano and Siviano.

The bordering municipalities are Iseo, Marone, Sale Marasino, Sulzano, Parzanica, Tavernola Bergamasca and Sarnico.

There are two main ports Carzano and Peschieria with a frequent ferry service with the surrounding mainland villages, including Iseo.

History
There are indications of a Roman settlement. The first written document mentioning "Insulae curtis" dates from 905, when the island was listed among the properties of the monastery of S. Salvatore in Brescia. The family Oldofredi, rulers of Iseo, built on the island two strongholds in the 11th-12th centuries. Members of the powerful Visconti family came here to hunt in 1400. In 1497 Francesco Sforza, duke of Milan, gave the islanders some fishing rights and reduced the taxes. In the same year, Caterina Cornaro, queen of Cyprus, resided a while on the island. During the 19th century the main industry on the island was the construction of boats and the manufacturing of fishing nets.

Peschiera Maraglio and Siviano (the municipal seat) merged in 1929 to create the actual comune.

In June and early July, 2016, Monte Isola was the site of The Floating Piers by artists Christo and Jeanne-Claude.

Main sights
The single-nave church of San Michele in Peschiera Maraglio was consecrated in 1648. This baroque church is notable for the many frescoes on the walls and on the ceiling and for its wooden carvings.

It can only be reached by walking from the small village of Cure.

The fortress Martinengo can be reached from Menzino. It was built in the 15th century by the Oldofredi family and enlarged in the 16th century by Martinengo. After a long period of neglect, it has been renovated in an elegant residence by the architect Vittorio Faglia. In 1497 Catherine Cornaro, queen of Cyprus, sojourned here for a short stay.

Transportation
Monte Isola can be reached through a network of ferry connection with regular schedules.

Driving restrictions are currently enforced, with mopeds and bicycles only allowed on the island. An extensive grid of dedicated bike lanes and hiking trails span all over the island, reaching the peaceful fishing villages with lakeside cafés and the Madonna della Ceriola chapel, nested near the summit of the island. A circular trail of almost  allows a complete tour of Monte Isola.

Photogallery

References

External links

 Monte Isola official website
Awarded "EDEN - European Destinations of Excellence" non traditional tourist destination 2010
 Website of the Santa Croce di Carzano festival

Cities and towns in Lombardy
Islands of Lombardy
Lake islands of Italy